Braian Abel Rivero (born 22 February 1996) is an Argentine professional footballer who plays as a midfielder for Arsenal Sarandí on loan from Defensa y Justicia.

Career
Rivero joined Newell's Old Boys' youth system in 2010. He got his senior career underway with Argentine Primera División side Newell's Old Boys in 2015, with his professional debut arriving on 28 September during an away win against Estudiantes. He didn't feature throughout the 2016 season, but did play five times during the following campaign of 2016–17. After sixty-seven appearances in all competitions for Newell's, Rivero departed on loan to Ecuadorian Serie A side Independiente del Valle in July 2020 until the end of 2021. The deal was made with a purchase option, with the Ecuadorian club paying a fee around USD 180,000 for the loan deal. His first appearance came in a win away to El Nacional on 15 August. On 30 January 2021, the spell was cut short, after Arsenal decided to recall the player.

In June 2021, Rivero was sold to Defensa y Justicia, signing a deal until the end of 2025. Due to lack of playing time, Rivero was in February 2022 loaned out to fellow league club, Arsenal de Sarandí, until the end of June 2022 with a purchase option.

Career statistics
.

References

External links

1996 births
Living people
Footballers from Córdoba, Argentina
Argentine footballers
Association football midfielders
Argentine expatriate footballers
Argentine Primera División players
Ecuadorian Serie A players
Newell's Old Boys footballers
C.S.D. Independiente del Valle footballers
Defensa y Justicia footballers
Arsenal de Sarandí footballers
Expatriate footballers in Ecuador
Argentine expatriate sportspeople in Ecuador